"Lay Your Hands on Me" (stylized as "LAY YOUR HANDS ON ME") is a song and an EP of the same name by Japanese electronica/rock duo Boom Boom Satellites, released on June 22, 2016. The track is used as the opening theme for the anime Kiznaiver. Due to vocalist and guitarist Michiyuki Kawashima's failing health, "Lay Your Hands on Me" serves as Boom Boom Satellites' final record.

Music video
On May 23, 2016, Boom Boom Satellites released a short version of the music video on YouTube.

Track listing

References

External links 
 
 

2016 singles
Boom Boom Satellites songs
2016 songs
Gr8! Records singles